Shane Ó hEochagáin (born 17 August 1969), known mononymously as Hector, is an Irish television and radio presenter born in Drogheda, County Louth, and raised in Navan, Co. Meath. He currently presents The Tommy and Hector Podcast with Laurita Blewitt. He previously presented Breakfast with Hector on weekday mornings on RTÉ 2fm from 4 October 2010 until Friday, 20 December 2013 and The Sunday Sitting Room on Today FM.

Career
Born as Shane Keogan in Drogheda, County Louth, Ó hEochagáin attended St Patrick's Classical School in Navan at the same time as Tommy Tiernan and Dylan Moran. He first came to the attention of Irish viewers with his travelogue programme Amú on TG4, the Irish language television station.

After a few series with TG4, he created and hosted two primetime series: Only Fools Buy Horses, which took a satirical look at the world of race-horse ownership; and Hanging with Hector, which featured Ó hEochagáin spending time with Irish celebrities. One episode featured Ó hEochagáin with Taoiseach Bertie Ahern. Others included a penalty shootout with goalkeeper Shay Given at Newcastle United; taking on Ken Doherty in snooker; and, most recently, spending time with Aidan O'Brien, one of the world's most successful race horse trainers.

He has won multiple Irish Film and Television Awards (IFTAs) for his shows, and presented a radio show on i102-104FM and RTÉ 2FM with close friend Tommy Tiernan.

Ó hEochagáin worked as a mechanical effects assistant on films such as "The Haunting of Hell House" and "Knocking On Death's Door". He has also appeared in advertisements for Paddy Whiskey and Horse Racing Ireland.

Ó hEochagáin has filmed multiple series for TG4 and which saw him travelling throughout Britain and Ireland and from Siberia to Saigon among others. He also presented two popular satirical documentaries on rugby, Chasing the Lions, a TV3 documentary featuring Après Match star Risteárd Cooper that saw both men follow the British and Irish Lions rugby team on their tour of New Zealand; and Chasing the Blues, following the misfortunes of the Irish rugby team at the World Cup in France.

In the 2010 autumn schedule of RTÉ 2fm, Ó hEochagáin was selected as the new presenter of the breakfast show, from 7 to 9am, starting on 4 October 2010, and broadcast from the RTÉ studios in Galway. The show was axed in December 2013, and in September 2014 Ó hEochagáin vowed that he would "never work for 2FM again".

In January 2013 he presented a new four-part series called Hector Goes on RTÉ 1. In Part One of the series, ‘Hector Goes Holy’, sees him discussing the role of the Catholic Church in contemporary Ireland.
Part Two called ‘Hector Goes Traveller’, has him discovering the Traveller lifestyle today in Ireland. Part Three, ‘Hector Goes Country’, sees him in the company of Mike Denver, and discovering the world of Country and Western music in Ireland. The final episode in the series, ‘Hector Goes Hunting’ sees him in the world of hunting and shooting in Ireland. The series was broadcast on RTÉ 1 and reached over 1.8 million viewers. A new series of Hector Goes started airing in March 2014. The first episode was called Hector Goes Fishing, and the second episode aired on 10 March and was called Hector goes Courtin.

Ó hEochagáin has also covered for Ian Dempsey on Today FM during 2015.

In 2019 he presented Hector USA - Ó Chósta go Cósta where he takes on a road trip in the US from Coast to Coast, across the Southern States from Savannah on the Atlantic to San Diego on the Pacific, road-tripping from Georgia through Alabama, Mississippi and Louisiana into Texas, New Mexico and Arizona before finishing up on the Pacific seaboard in California, covering 8 states and more than 5000 miles on the road.

Since September 2020, he presents The Tommy and Hector Podcast with Laurita Blewitt.

References

External links
 Official website
 
 Galway Independent Profile

1969 births
20th-century Irish people
21st-century Irish people
Living people
Irish radio presenters
People educated at St Patrick's Classical School
People from Navan
RTÉ 2fm presenters
RTÉ television presenters
TG4 presenters